Gaëtan Barlot (born 13 April 1997 in Clermont-Ferrand) is a French rugby union player. He currently plays at hooker for Castres in the Top 14.

Following an outburst of COVID-19 in the French squad, he was called up for the first time by Fabien Galthié to the France national rugby team on 22 February 2021.

References

External links
France profile at FFR
AllRugby Profile
Castres Olympique Profile

French rugby union players
1997 births
Living people
Castres Olympique players
US Colomiers players
Rugby union hookers
France international rugby union players
Sportspeople from Clermont-Ferrand